Canoe Creek Indian Reserve No. 2, known officially as Canoe Creek 2, is an Indian reserve in British Columbia, Canada, governed by the Canoe Creek/Dog Creek Indian Band, located six miles east of the mouth of Canoe Creek into the Fraser River.

See also
List of Indian reserves in British Columbia
Canoe Creek (disambiguation)

References

Indian reserves in British Columbia
Geography of the Cariboo
Secwepemc